Madeleine Perk (born 13 May 1975) is a Swiss former synchronized swimmer who competed in the 2000 Summer Olympics.

References

1975 births
Living people
Swiss synchronized swimmers
Olympic synchronized swimmers of Switzerland
Synchronized swimmers at the 2000 Summer Olympics